Mark Wayne Smolinski (born May 9, 1939) is a former professional American football player for the NFL's Baltimore Colts and the AFL's World Champion New York Jets.

Personal life
Smolinski went to school in Rogers City, Michigan, where he now summers on Grand Lake in Presque Isle, Michigan.
He married his wife Janice (Wetsch) Smolinski on June 1, 1968, and has three children: Shawn, Erica and Shadd. He has five grandchildren two that live in Northern Michigan, two in Montana and one in California.

Coaching career
Upon retiring from professional football, Smolinski returned to Northern Michigan and took a coaching job at Petoskey High School in Petoskey, Michigan, where he currently resides.

Historical Museum
In 2009, Smolinski was honored by the Presque Isle Historical Museum as "a hometown hero to several generations." The exhibit featured photos and memorabilia from both his high school days and his professional career.

References

1939 births
Living people
Players of American football from Michigan
American football running backs
Wyoming Cowboys football players
Baltimore Colts players
New York Jets players
People from Presque Isle County, Michigan
People from Alpena, Michigan
American Football League players